Brother Where You Bound is the eighth studio album by the English rock band Supertramp, released in 1985. It was their first album after original member Roger Hodgson left the band, leaving Rick Davies to handle the songwriting and singing on his own. The album features the group's Top 30 hit "Cannonball".

Brother Where You Bound reached number 20 on the UK Albums Chart and number 21 on The Billboard 200 in 1985, and went Gold according to the band's then label A&M Records in 1985, although the RIAA hasn't certified it yet.

A remastered CD version of the album was released on 30 July 2002 on A&M Records.

Songs
The track "Better Days" features an extended fade-out with voice-overs by the four key players in the 1984 Presidential Campaign: quotes spoken by Geraldine Ferraro and Walter Mondale sounding from the left audio channel and those of George H. W. Bush and Ronald Reagan on the right, mixed with John Helliwell's extended saxophone solo.  Cash Box called that song "a solidly driving rocker" and praised the production values and melody.

The album's sixteen-and-a-half-minute title track featured Thin Lizzy's Scott Gorham on rhythm guitar and Pink Floyd's David Gilmour on the guitar solos. Also, the track had readings from George Orwell's Nineteen Eighty-Four. A demo for the song was recorded prior to Roger Hodgson's departure from the band, for potential inclusion on …Famous Last Words…, but the band ultimately felt it was too densely progressive rock to be appropriate, and decided against recording it for the album. At the time of the demo, the song was only ten minutes long.

Release
To build interest in the release, the album was premiered to dozens of members of the press traveling aboard a specially chartered trip on the Orient Express from Paris to Venice, where reporters were shown the full video for "Brother Where You Bound". The normally low-profile group also did extensive radio and TV appearances, including a high-profile appearance on radio's Rockline after a simulcast of the "Brother Where You Bound" video on MTV and Global Satellite Network.

Reception

AllMusic's retrospective review is resoundingly positive, noting that the album's thematic exploration of Cold War tensions "is dated and hasn't aged very well… but the music is a pleasure." They particularly praised the "crystalline sound", the strong performances of the guest musicians, and the complexity of the compositions. They also praised the band for being "gutsy" enough to "re-embrace its progressive-rock roots" while improving their pop songcraft at the same time.

In a review special, Prog Sphere writes "Brother Where You Bound is a prime example of 'crossover'  prog at its very best, and as such highly recommended to anyone but those prog fans who think that 'pop' is inevitably a bad word."

Track listing
All songs written by Rick Davies.

Personnel
Supertramp
Rick Davies – keyboards, lead vocals
John Helliwell – saxophones, glockenspiel on track 1
Dougie Thomson – bass
Bob Siebenberg – drums
Additional personnel
David Gilmour – guitar solos on "Brother Where You Bound"
Scott Gorham – rhythm guitar on "Brother Where You Bound"
Marty Walsh – guitar on "Cannonball", "Better Days", "Brother Where You Bound", and "Still in Love"
Doug Wintz – trombone on "Cannonball"
Cha Cha – backing vocals on "Still in Love"
Brian Banks – Synclavier programming
Anthony Marinelli – Synclavier programming
Gary Chang – Fairlight & PPG programming
Scott Page – flute on "Better Days" and "Brother Where You Bound"

Production
Producers: David Kershenbaum, Supertramp
Engineer: Norman Hall
Assistant engineer: Steve Crimmel
Mixing: Mark Ettel
Mixing assistant: Steve McMillan
Mastering: Bob Ludwig
Remastering: Greg Calbi, Jay Messina
Track engineer: Allen Sides
Programming: Gary Chang
Synclavier programming: Brian Banks, Anthony Marinelli
Art direction: Norman Moore
Design: Norman Moore
Tray photo: Tom Gibson
2002 A&M reissue:
The 2002 A&M Records reissue was mastered from the original master tapes by Greg Calbi and Jay Messina at Sterling Sound, New York, 2002. The reissue was supervised by Bill Levenson with art direction by Vartan and design by Mike Diehl, with production coordination by Beth Stempel.

Singles
Charts – Billboard (United States)

Charts

Weekly charts

Year-end charts

Certifications and sales

References 

Supertramp albums
1985 albums
A&M Records albums
Albums produced by Rick Davies
Albums produced by David Kershenbaum
Albums recorded at United Western Recorders